Diarmuid Hegarty may refer to:

Diarmuid Hegarty (academic), president of Griffith College Dublin
Diarmuid O'Hegarty (1892–1958), member of the Irish Republican Army